XEF-AM is a talk radio station on 1420 AM in Ciudad Juárez, Chihuahua, Mexico. XEF-AM is known as Activa and is owned by MegaRadio.

History
XEF-AM went on the air at 1450 kHz on September 29, 1935. It was the first station in the Juárez-El Paso region to broadcast exclusively in Spanish, receiving its concession in 1937. José Carlos Amaya was the original concessionaire; by the 1960s, Boone Menchaca was the concessionaire.

References

1935 establishments in Mexico
Mass media in Ciudad Juárez
Mexican radio stations with expired concessions
Radio stations established in 1935
Radio stations in Chihuahua
Spanish-language radio stations